Ole Jørgen Hammeken − born in 1956 in Nuuk, the capital of Greenland, of Maritha and Motzflot Hammeken − is a Greenlandic explorer and actor, based in Denmark and Russia.

Career

Polar exploration
He participated in 2007 in the 'Global Warming Dogsled Expedition' – a journey of over  up and over the Greenland ice sheet from Uummannaq Fjord to Ilulissat, intended to draw people's attention to climate change and global warming.

In 2008, Hammeken completed a circumpolar voyage in a motorized open boat. In February 2009, Hammeken planned a centennial dog sled trip from northern Canada to the North Pole, 771 km (480 mi), one-way, minimum distance, retracing the footsteps of Robert Peary. He is a member of The Explorers Club.

Acting 
In 2009 Hammeken played the lead role of Ikuma in Le Voyage D'Inuk, a French-Greenlandic film in the Greenlandic language. The film premiered on 20 April 2010 in Stockholm, Sweden.

Personal life 
In 1993 Hammeken returned from Denmark, having abandoned a judicial career, deciding to settle in Uummannaq. January 2013 Hammeken moved from Uummannaq.

Hammeken is an advocate of traditional Greenlandic arts, preservation of dogsledding and historical hunting techniques.

He has a daughter named Alexandra Pipaluk Hammeken born in 1993.

References

Greenlandic polar explorers
Greenlandic sportspeople
People from Nuuk
People from Uummannaq
Living people
1956 births
Greenlandic sportsmen